Captain Hiram Cox (1760–1799) was a British diplomat, serving in Bengal and Burma in the 18th century. The city of Cox's Bazar in Bangladesh is named after him.

Biography 
As an officer of the East India Company, Captain Cox was appointed Superintendent of Palongkee outpost after Warren Hastings became Governor of Bengal. Captain Cox was specially mobilised to deal with a century-long conflict between Arakan refugees and local Rakhains (see Rakhine State). He embarked upon the mammoth task of rehabilitating refugees in the area and made significant progress. A premature death took Captain Cox in 1799 before he could finish his work. To commemorate his role in rehabilitation work, a market was established and named after him: Cox's Bazar ("Cox's Market").

Cox was a member of the Asiatic Society, contributing scholarly articles on Asian culture to its journal Asiatic Researches. He is most noted for his long-debunked theory of the origin of chess as a four-player game, known as the Cox-Forbes theory.

See also
 Cox's Bazar
 Residents in Asia

References

1760 births
1799 deaths
British chess players
Chess historians
British East India Company Army officers